Coryates Halt was a small railway station on the Abbotsbury branch railway in the west of the English county of Dorset. It consisted of a single platform and GWR pagoda shelter. Opened on 1 May 1906, it was sited next to an overbridge carrying a lane to a dairy and the villages of Coryates and Shilvinghampton. Part of a scheme that saw several halts opened on the GWR and other railways to counter road competition, it was served by Railmotors, carriages equipped with driving ends and their own small steam engine.

Friar Waddon Milk Platform 

This small platform at the two mile point of the branch, between Upwey and Coryates, was used to serve the local dairies and even had a Sunday train to get the milk to markets early on Monday morning in the days before domestic refrigeration was common.

The station and platform closed with the branch in 1952.

The site today
The remains of the wooden platform at Coryates slowly return to nature in the field next to the abutments of the former bridge.

Further reading 

  
   ISBN(no ISBN)

External links
 The station on navigable 1946 O. S. map

Disused railway stations in Dorset
Former Great Western Railway stations
Railway stations in Great Britain opened in 1906
Railway stations in Great Britain closed in 1952